Padroso may refer to the following places in Portugal:

Padroso (Arcos de Valdevez), a parish in the municipality of Arcos de Valdevez
Padroso (Montalegre), a parish in the municipality of Montalegre